Vijay Sharma is an Indian painter and art historian, known for his expertise in the Pahari school of miniature painting. He was honored by the Government of India, in 2012, with the fourth highest Indian civilian award of Padma Shri.

Biography

Vijay Sharma was born on 12 September 1962 to Geetadevi and Anantram Sharma at Mohalla Ramgarh, of the district of Chamba, in the Indian state of Himachal Pradesh. His father, a bus driver working for Himachal Road Transport Corporation, noticed his son's penchant for drawing and sent the boy to Banares to learn painting, when he was only 15. Though Sharma returned from Banares after a week's stay, he continued to hone his skills under Mirza Ashgar Beg and by visiting the Bhuri Singh Museum in Chamba. Meanwhile, he passed Hindi Prabhakar examination and, later, secured a master's degree (MA) in History from Himachal Pradesh University, Shimla. After his academics, Sharma went back to Varanasi to learn miniature painting at Bharat Kala Bhawan under the tutelage of Ved Pal Sharma. He also attended an archaeological training camp conducted at Hampi, Karnataka by the Archaeological Survey of India in 1985.

Sharma started working as a painter for the Himachal Road Transport Corporation at the age of 18 but, later, shifted to the Department of Language and Culture, Government of Himachal Pradesh as a conservation assistant. He resigned from the post in 1988 and is an accredited artist at the Bhuri Singh Museum, Chamba, Himachal Pradesh.

Vijay Sharma has founded Shilpa Parishad, a non governmental organization, for promoting the genre of miniature painting, especially the Pahari school and serves as its president. He has also participated in many artist workshops such as the NZCC All India miniature painting workshop at Kalagram, Chandigarh in 2006, the Janapravaha artist workshop of 2005, workshop organized by the Birla Academy of Art and Culture, Kolkata in 2007, miniature camp in connection with the Gita Jayanti Utsav of 2008, miniature camp held at the Indian Institute of Advanced Study, Shimla in 2009, camp organized by Mohanlal Sukhadia University, Udaipur in 2011 and Harmony Painting Residency 2012 organized by Harmony Art Foundation, Mumbai.

Sharma is a government nominated member of the governing council of the Himachal Academy of Art, Culture and Languages and an executive committee member of the North Zone Cultural Centre, a regional body established by the Government of India for the promotion of arts, crafts, traditions and cultural heritage of India. He is a founder member of the Kangra Arts Promotion Society and has also served as an honorary advisor to the Delhi Crafts Council, an NGO working for the revival of Indian arts and crafts.

A follower of the Basholi and Kangra styles of Pahari painting, Sharma is also known to be a scholar and art historian. He is reported to have learnt the ancient scripts of Śāradā and Takri and has published many books and articles on the arts and crafts of Himachal Pradesh.

Vijay Sharma is married to Neeru Sharma and the couple has two sons, Sarang and Maitreya. The family lives in Mohalla Ramgarh near Dasnami Akhara in Chamba.

Awards and recognitions
Vijay Sharma received the Himachal Pradesh state award in 1980 for his ragamala paintings followed by the award from the Ministry of Textiles in 1990. All India Fine Arts and Crafts Society awarded him their annual AIFACS Award in 1997 and Sharma received the Kalidas Samman in 2011. in 2012, the Government of India included him in the Republic Day honours list for the award of Padma Shri.

In 2013, Himachal Pradesh University awarded him the honorary doctorate.

See also

 Pahari painting
 Ragamala paintings

References

Further reading

External links
 
 :de:Vijay Sharma (Maler), Retrieved 3 December 2014
 
 
 

1962 births
Living people
Recipients of the Padma Shri in arts
Painters from Himachal Pradesh
Indian male painters
20th-century Indian painters
People from Chamba district
20th-century Indian male artists